Mailis Reps (née Rand, born 13 January 1975) is an Estonian politician, a member of the Estonian Centre Party. She served as the Minister of Education and Research from 2002 to 2003, 2005 to 2007 and 2016 to 2020.

Early life and education
Reps was born in Tallinn, Estonia.  From 1993 to 1998 she studied law at the Academy Nord in Tallinn. She holds currently two Master degrees: the first in law from the Central European University and the second in public relations from Maastricht University. Since 2001 she is studying international and European law at doctorate level in Uppsala University.

From 2000 to 2001 Mailis Rand worked in the European Commission Directorate-General of Personnel and Administration. Since year 2000 she is also a lecturer of international public law in the Academy Nord and in the Riga Graduate School of Law.

Political career
On 28 January 2002 Mailis Rand became the Estonian Minister of Education in the government of Siim Kallas. She was often criticised for her youth and inexperience. Although she was unable to solve several crucial problems of Estonian education, she fought for more funding to education and was elected Friend of Education by Estonian Education Forum in October 2002. Mailis Rand renamed the Ministry of Education to the Ministry of Education and Research (in effect since 1 January 2003) to reflect the central role of this government institution in administration of higher education and research activities.

She was also the Minister to merge two leading academic libraries of Estonia – Estonian Academic Library and Tallinn Pedagogical University Library. The merger was signed on 8 April 2003, 2 days before the resignation of the government.

Mailis Rand became then member of the Estonian Parliament (Riigikogu). She was also elected to the Board of the Estonian Centre Party and appointed the Party's Secretary on Foreign Relations. She was one of the persons involved in preparing the controversial contract of co-operation between the Estonian Centre Party and Russian 'party of the power' United Russia in December 2004.

After the resignation of the government of Prime Minister Juhan Parts she was appointed again Minister of Education and Research on 13 April 2005. Main activities of her second term have been preparation of the new general curriculum, approval of the new vocational education agenda, improving and expanding learning in Estonian in the schools of Russian-speaking minority, provision of free lunches to pupils and approval of the new vocational standard for teachers.

Since 2005 she is also a Vice-Chairperson of the Estonian Centre Party.

Member of PACE
As member of the Parliamentary Assembly of the Council of Europe (PACE), Reps serves as full member of the Committee on Legal Affairs and Human Rights (as Second Vice-Chairperson); the Committee on the Election of Judges to the European Court of Human Rights; the Committee on the Honouring of Obligations and Commitments by Member States of the Council of Europe (Monitoring Committee); and the Sub-Committee on Human Rights. In late September 2014, she and fellow parliamentarian Marietta de Pourbaix-Lundin of Sweden assessed the reform agenda initiated by President Petro Poroshenko of Ukraine, reviewed the state of the armed insurgency in the east of Ukraine, and evaluated ethnic tensions in Odessa following the fire of 2 May. Alongside Jean-Claude Mignon of France, she is currently co-rapporteur on the honouring of obligations and commitments by Ukraine.

Controversy
Mailis Reps was heavily criticised after her official visit to the Mari-El Republic, a federal subject of Russia in August 2005. While several European (including Estonian) politicians have drawn attention to the discrimination of Mari people in this republic and issued statements on the topic, Mailis Reps spoke very positively about the current state of native inhabitants, their culture and education in her interview to Russian television. She later claimed that her statements were taken out of context by Russian TV and that her poor knowledge of Russian contributed to misunderstanding what she had actually meant.

Personal life
After marrying a Latvian lawyer Agris Repšs she started to use a simplified version of her husband's surname (Reps). The marriage produced six children before divorce was announced in February 2019.

Timeline
2002–2003 Estonian Minister of Education
2003–2005 Member of the Estonian Parliament (Riigikogu)
2003–2005 Secretary of Foreign Affairs of the Estonian Centre Party
2003– Member of the Board of the Estonian Centre Party
2005–2007 Estonian Minister of Education and Research
2005– Vice-Chairperson of the Estonian Centre Party
2007– Member of the Estonian Parliament (Riigikogu)

References

1975 births
21st-century Estonian politicians
21st-century Estonian women politicians
Central European University alumni
Estonian Centre Party politicians
Living people
Members of the Riigikogu, 2003–2007
Members of the Riigikogu, 2007–2011
Members of the Riigikogu, 2011–2015
Members of the Riigikogu, 2015–2019
Members of the Riigikogu, 2019–2023
Politicians from Tallinn
Women government ministers of Estonia
Women members of the Riigikogu